Konrad Motorsport is an auto racing team initially from Austria, but now based in Germany.  Founded by Austrian racer Franz Konrad in 1976, the team has mostly run Porsches, although they have also run Ferraris, Lamborghinis, and Saleens over their existence.

History

Initially competing in the Interserie championship, the team later moved to the World Sportscar Championship running Porsche 962s.  In 1991, Franz Konrad designed his own Group C chassis for the World Sportscar Championship with Lamborghini backing, known as the Konrad KM-011, although the car was not successful.

The team moved to smaller championships in 1993, where they won the 24 Hours Nürburgring and Mil Milhas Brasileiras, the later of which they won again in 1995.  The team eventually moved to the BPR Global GT Series competing with Porsche 911 GT2s.  By 1997, the team would be involved in multiple racing series, including the FIA GT Championship, IMSA GT Championship, and the Porsche Supercup.  After briefly running Lola prototypes, the team eventually switched to running Saleen S7-Rs in the American Le Mans Series and FIA GT Championship.

The team returned to running Porsche 911 GT3-RSRs in 2006, where they won the 24 Hours of Bahrain.  Konrad Motorsport continues to use their Porsches in competition today.

Konrad Motorsports partnered with Dempsey Racing for the 2014 United SportsCar Championship season, fielding a Porsche 911 GT America in the GTD class.

References

External links
 

German auto racing teams
Austrian auto racing teams
European Le Mans Series teams
FIA GT Championship teams
Porsche Supercup teams
WeatherTech SportsCar Championship teams

German Formula 3 teams
International GT Open teams
Blancpain Endurance Series teams
British GT Championship teams
FIA Sportscar Championship entrants
World Sportscar Championship teams
American Le Mans Series teams
Auto racing teams established in 1976
24 Hours of Le Mans teams